Marifat Nasibov (May 22, 1972, Qazakh District, Azerbaijan – January 28, 1992, Quşçu Ayrım, Qazakh District, Azerbaijan ) was the National Hero of Azerbaijan, and the warrior of the Karabakh war.

Biography 
Marifat Nasibov was born on 22 May 1972 in Mazam village of Qazakh District. He studied at the village school of Qazakh District in 1979–1989. He was called up to the military service in 1990.  After completing his military service in the Soviet Army, he returned to Azerbaijan. Marifat went to the front line as a volunteer.

Military career 
At the end of 1991, he went to the frontline as a volunteer. He was one of the bravest soldiers in his battalion. Marifat participated in battles around the villages of Qazakh District. He died in a battle around the village of Qushchu Ayrım in Qazakh District.

Memorial 
He was posthumously awarded the title of "National Hero of Azerbaijan" by Presidential Decree No. 833 dated 7 June 1992.

There was a fountain named after him in the park named after Heydar Aliyev in Qazakh District. In 2013, a documentary entitled “The nest of an Eagle” released. The documentary looks into memorials surrounding the lives and battlefields of Marifat Nasibov as well as two other National Heros of Azerbaijan; Rafig Alikhanov and Shamoy Chobanov from Qazakh District.

See also 
 First Nagorno-Karabakh War
 List of National Heroes of Azerbaijan

References

Sources 
Vugar Asgarov. Azərbaycanın Milli Qəhrəmanları (Yenidən işlənmiş II nəşr). Bakı: "Dərələyəz-M", 2010, səh. 227.

1972 births
1992 deaths
Azerbaijani military personnel
Azerbaijani military personnel of the Nagorno-Karabakh War
Azerbaijani military personnel killed in action
National Heroes of Azerbaijan
People from Qazax District